Siphamandla Mavanda (born 27 June 1997) is a South African cricketer. He made his List A debut for Free State in the 2018–19 CSA Provincial One-Day Challenge on 28 October 2018. He made his first-class debut for Free State in the 2018–19 CSA 3-Day Provincial Cup on 1 November 2018. In September 2019, he was named in Free State's squad for the 2019–20 CSA Provincial T20 Cup. He made his Twenty20 debut for Free State in the 2019–20 CSA Provincial T20 Cup on 13 September 2019.

References

External links
 

1997 births
Living people
South African cricketers
Free State cricketers
Place of birth missing (living people)